Ibias is a municipality in the Autonomous Community of the Principality of Asturias, Spain. It is bordered on the north by Allande and A Fonsagranda and Negueira (in the Province of Lugo, Galicia); on the east by Degaña and Cangas de Narcea; on the south by Peranzais and Candín (in the province of León) y on the west by A Fonsagrada and Navia de Suarna (also in Lugo province).

Parishes
There are 11 parishes (administrative divisions):
Cecos
Marentes
Los Cotos 
Pelliceira 
San Antolín 
San Clemente
Sena
Seroiro
Sisterna 
Taladrid 
Tormaleo

References

External links
Federación Asturiana de Concejos  
Web de la fiesta de la campa 

Municipalities in Asturias